Thomas Lear may refer to:

Sir Thomas Lear, 1st Baronet of the Lear baronets
Thomas Van Lear

See also
Lear (surname)